Alaina Kalanj (also known as Alaina Huffman) (born April 17, 1980), is a Canadian film and television actress, best known for the television series Painkiller Jane, where she played the character Maureen Bowers.  She played Dinah Lance / Black Canary in the TV series Smallville, and 1st Lt. Tamara Johansen in Stargate Universe, where she was a regular cast member.  She played the part of the demon Abaddon in the American dark-fantasy television series Supernatural.

Biography
Huffman was born Alaina Kalanj in Vancouver, British Columbia, Canada.  She is of Croatian descent.  At the age of 13, she went to her first audition for a Fox Family Channel pilot, where she was offered the main role.  A scout for a modeling agency instead recruited Huffman, and she was set to model in high fashion runways in Europe and Japan for the following years.

When her parents moved to Dallas, Texas, she saw the opportunity to live in the United States and enroll in college, leaving modeling behind.  While in school, she took on acting roles in a series of independent films.  Eventually she moved to Los Angeles, where she added more television credits to her resume.

Alaina has four children with ex-husband John Huffman: sons Elijah and Lincoln, and daughters Hanna and Charley-Jane. While pregnant with Charley-Jane, she was acting in the first season of Stargate Universe, so the pregnancy was written into the plot.

Filmography

References

External links 

 
 Comics Continuum: Smallville
 Alaina Huffman interview by Nalini Haynes, Dark Matter Zine, October 2014

1980 births
Actresses from Vancouver
Female models from British Columbia
Canadian film actresses
Canadian television actresses
Living people
21st-century Canadian actresses
Canadian people of Croatian descent